Man's Best Friend is a 1935 feature film about the adventures of a boy and his dog Lightning.  The film stars Douglas Haig, an American child actor of the 1920s and 1930s;  Lightning, a grandson of Strongheart; Frank Brownlee;  and Mary McLaren.

Man's Best Friend was the high point of Douglas Haig's career as a film actor.  In 1986, TV Guide described the film as a "simple, unpretentious story of a little mountain boy and his pet police dog".

Man's Best Friend has been released on DVD, together with The Secret Code.

Plot 
A boy (Haig) and his dog Lightning contend with the boy's abusive father.

References

External links

1935 films
1935 adventure films
American black-and-white films
Films about dogs
Fictional dogs
American adventure films
1930s English-language films
1930s American films